Vápno (literally lime in Czech) may refer to places in the Czech Republic:

Vápno (Pardubice District), a municipality and village in the Pardubice Region
Vápno, a village and part of Hlavice in the Liberec Region